The Central Southern District is  a district of Caldas Department, Colombia.

Manizales (Capital)
Chinchina
Neira
Palestina
Villamaria

References 

Subregions of Caldas Department